Leandro Roberto Romano (born 8 June 1997) is an Argentine professional footballer who plays as a midfielder.

Career
Romano started his career in the ranks of Nueva Chicago San Justo, before signing for Huracán in 2008. June 2018 saw the midfielder depart on loan, as he joined Sacachispas of Primera B Metropolitana. After substitute appearances against Almirante Brown and Defensores Unidos, Romano made his first start in senior football in a 2–0 victory over Colegiales on 2 October 2018. He featured seven further times for Sacachispas, prior to returning to Huracán in June 2019. Romano remained at the club for a further twelve months, but would only feature at reserve level before his eventual release in June 2020.

Career statistics
.

References

External links

1997 births
Living people
Footballers from Buenos Aires
Argentine footballers
Association football midfielders
Primera B Metropolitana players
Club Atlético Huracán footballers
Sacachispas Fútbol Club players